Dar Batḥa (pronounced Bat-ḥaa), or Qasr al-Batḥa, is a former royal palace in the city of Fez, Morocco. The palace was commissioned by the Alaouite Sultan Hassan I in the late 19th century and finished under his successor Abdelaziz. It was converted into a museum of historical arts and crafts in 1915 with a collection that now comprises over 6,500 objects. The palace is located near Bab Bou Jeloud at the western edge of Fes el-Bali, the old medina quarter of the city, and close to Fes el-Jdid, the new medina quarter. It is adjacent to the Dar el-Beida palace located to its southeast, which was originally part of the same complex.

History
Before the reign of Moulay Hassan I (ruled 1873–1894), the land on which Dar Batha is located was occupied only by small isolated structures between Fes el-Bali and Fes el-Jdid. It was only when Moulay Hassan decided to build a corridor of walls connecting the two cities that much of this space was filled with royal gardens (such as Jnan Sbil) and palaces. The land for Dar Batha was purchased from the wealthy Ben Jelloun family of Fes.

Dar Batha and Dar el-Beida were constructed to serve as a summer palace and as a residence for distinguished visitors and guests. The palace was commissioned and begun in the late 19th century by Moulay Hassan I and then finished and embellished by Moulay Abdelaziz (ruled 1894–1908). One source reports that construction took place between 1886 and 1907. The adjoining Dar el-Beida was completed by Sultan Abdelhafid (ruled 1909–1912), the last independent sultan of Morocco in the early 20th century.

In 1912 both palaces were used to house the services of the Resident-general of the new French Protectorate. In 1915, Dar Batha was converted into a museum of local arts (previously housed at the Dar Adiyel), then eventually as a national ethnographical museum and cultural center. In 1924 it was classified as a national monument.

In 2016, a campaign to renovate many of Morocco's museums began. Renovation works on the Batha Museum were begun in April 2019, with a projected cost of 15.6 million Moroccan dirhams. The project aims to reopen the palace as a "Museum of Islamic Arts".

Architecture 

The main entrance of the building leads to a vast rectangular courtyard around which the building is centered. The courtyard is surrounded by galleries and by the two main wings of the building are at its eastern and western ends. The courtyard floor is decorated at its west and east ends with colorful zellij mosaic tilework across its floor and around its ornamental fountains. The galleries at the east and west ends of the courtyard consist of large horseshoe arches in brick, while the galleries to the north and south of the central garden are made of painted wood. Some of the other rooms around the palace are also decorated with zellij and painted woodwork.

The garden represents a typical riad layout and Andalusian style, a rectangular area divided into four parts along its two central axes, with a fountain at its middle. It makes up around 58% of the entire area of the palace. The garden was originally arranged by landscape architect Jean-Claude Nicolas Forestier in 1915 for the recreational use of the visitors, especially during the summer. Among the tree and plant species here are palm trees, jacarandas, and hibiscus. Today, concerts and religious festivals are held in the garden.

Museum collection 
The museum houses a large and valuable collection of 6500 archaeological and historical art artifacts. Many of them are taken from the historic or ruined buildings in the medina of Fez (Fes el-Bali and Fes el-Jdid), including various mosques and madrasas. Some of the oldest artifacts and pieces of art in Fes are housed here, including architectural fragments from the Idrisid era and the remains of the 9th-century minbar of the Andalusian Mosque, crafted under both Fatimid and Andalusian Umayyad patronage. The 14th-century minbar of the Bou Inania Madrasa is also housed here. Other artifacts include historic Qur'ans, astrolabes, musical instruments, carpets, jewelry, and a large collection of local ceramics in the "blue" style of Fes. The objects are arranged thematically across the rooms of the palace.

See also
 Kasbah Palace, Tangier
 List of Moroccan royal residences

References

19th-century establishments in Africa
Museums in Morocco
Tourist attractions in Fez, Morocco
Palaces in Fez, Morocco
'Alawi architecture